Within the South-West Indian Ocean, the term severe tropical storms is reserved for those systems, that have winds of at least . It is the second-highest classification used within the South-West Indian Ocean to classify tropical cyclones with.

Background
The South-West Indian Ocean tropical cyclone basin is located to the south of the Equator between Africa and 90°E. The basin is officially monitored by Météo-France who run the Regional Specialised  Meteorological Centre in La Réunion, while other meteorological services such as the Australian Bureau of Meteorology, Mauritius Meteorological Service as well as the United States Joint Typhoon Warning Center also monitor the basin.

Systems

|-
| Roma || 18 February 23, 1973 ||  ||  || None || None || None ||
|-
| Honorine ||  ||  ||  || None ||  ||  ||
|-
| Norah ||  ||  ||   || Christmas Island, Cocos Island ||  ||  ||
|-
| Ines ||  ||  ||  || None ||  ||  ||
|-
| Junon ||  ||  ||  || None ||  ||  ||
|-
| Kevin ||  ||  ||  || None ||  ||  ||
|-
| Tony ||  ||  ||  || None ||  ||  ||
|-
| Ikonjo ||  ||  ||  || Seychelles ||  ||  ||
|-
| Antoinette ||  ||  ||  || None ||  ||  ||
|-
| Alex-Andree ||  ||  ||  || None ||  ||  ||
|-
| Juba ||  ||  ||  || None ||  ||  ||
|}

2010's

|-
| Adjali ||  ||  ||  || None ||  ||  ||
|-
| Chedza ||  ||  ||  || Southern Africa, Madagascar, Réunion ||  ||  ||
|-
| Fundi ||  ||  ||  || Madagascar ||  ||  ||
|-
| Glenda ||  ||  ||  || None ||  ||  ||
|-
| Ikola ||  ||  ||  || None ||  ||  ||
|-
| Abela ||  ||  ||  || Madagascar ||  ||  ||
|-
| Flamboyan ||  ||  ||  || None ||  ||  ||
|-
| Bongoyo ||  ||  ||  || Cocos Islands ||  ||  ||
|-
| Chalane ||  ||  ||  || Madagascar, Mozambique, Zimbabwe, Botswana, Namibia || Minimal ||  || 
|-
| Danilo ||  ||  ||  || Chagos Archipelago ||  ||  ||
|-
| Jasmine ||  ||  ||  || Comoros, Mozambique, Madagascar ||  ||  || 
|}

Climatology

See also

South-West Indian Ocean tropical cyclone

References

External links
Meteo France La Reunion
 Direction Générale de la Météorologie de Madagascar
 Mauritius Meteorological Services
 Joint Typhoon Warning Center (JTWC)

Lists of tropical cyclones by intensity
Severe tropical storms